The Roman Catholic Archdiocese of Asunción is an ecclesiastical territory or diocese of the Roman Catholic Church in Paraguay.

It was created as the Diocese of Paraguay by Pope Paul III on July 1, 1547, and was elevated to the rank of a metropolitan archdiocese by Pope Pius XI on May 1, 1929, with the suffragan sees of Benjamín Aceval, Caacupé, Carapeguá, Ciudad del Este, Concepción, Coronel Oviedo, Encarnación, San Juan Bautista de las Misiones, San Lorenzo, San Pedro, and Villarrica del Espíritu Santo.

The archdiocese's mother church and thus seat of its archbishop is the Cathedral of Our Lady of the Assumption. As the only metropolitan in Paraguay, it is the principal episcopal see of that country.  the Archbishop of Asunción was Eustaquio Cuquejo Verga, CSSR, having been appointed by Pope John Paul II on June 15, 2002. On Tuesday, November 8, 2011, Pope Benedict XVI, appointed Bishop Edmundo Valenzuela, S.D.B., as Coadjutor Archbishop of the Archdiocese. Until then he had served as Vicar Apostolic of the Apostolic Vicariate of Chaco Paraguayo, with the ecclesiastical rank of Bishop (Vicariates Apostolic are a type of jurisdiction that rank below a diocese). He was born in Villarrica of Espiritu Santo, Paraguay, on November 19, 1944. He was ordained to the priesthood on April 3, 1971, as a member of the Salesians of Don Bosco. He received a licentiate in theology from the Salesian University in Rome. At one time, he was a missionary in Angola (1991–2006). On February 13, 2006, he was named Titular Bishop of Uzal and appointed Vicar Apostolic of Chaco, Paraguay, receiving episcopal ordination on April 22, 2006. As part of the Episcopal Conference of Paraguay, he serves as Chairman of the Commission for Catholic Education. The archdiocese has 1.58 million Catholics (90.6%) in 2012.

Archbishop Valenzuela succeeded to the see on November 6, 2014.

Bishops

Ordinaries
Diocese of Paraguay
Erected: 1 July 1547
Latin Name: de Paraguay
 Juan de los Barrios, O.F.M. (1547–1552), appointed Bishop of Santa Marta, Colombia
 Pedro de la Torre, O.F.M. (1554–1573)
 Alfonso Guerra (bishop), O.P. (1579–1592), appointed Bishop of Michoacán, México
 Thomas Vásquez de Liaño (1596–1599)
 Martín Ignacio de Loyola (1601–1608)
 Reginaldo de Lizárraga, O.P. (1609)
 Lorenzo Pérez de Grado (1615–1619), appointed Bishop of Cuzco, Peru
 Tomás de la Torre Gibaja, O.P. (1620–1628), appointed Bishop of Córdoba (Tucumán), Argentina
 Cristóbal de Aresti Martínez de Aguilar, O.S.B. (1629–1635), appointed Bishop of Buenos Aires, Argentina
 Francisco de la Serna, O.E.S.A. (1635–1638), appointed Bishop of Popayán, Colombia
 Bernardino de Cárdenas Ponce, O.F.M. (1640–1666), appointed Bishop of Santa Cruz de la Sierra, Bolivia
 Gabriel de Guilléstegui, O.F.M. (1666–1670), appointed Bishop of La Paz, Bolivia
 Ferdinandus de Valcácer (1672) 
 Faustino Casas Hernández, O. de M. (1674–1686)
 Sebastián de Pastrana, O. de M. (1693–1700)
 Pedro Díaz de Durana (1704–1718) 
 José Luis Palos Bord, O.F.M. (1724–1738)
 José Cayetano Paravicino, O.F.M. (1738–1747), appointed Bishop of Trujillo, Peru
 Bernardo José Pérez de Oblitas (1747–1756), appointed Bishop of Santa Cruz de la Sierra, Bolivia
 Manuel Antonio de la Torre (1756–1762), appointed Bishop of Buenos Aires, Argentina
 Emmanuel López de Espinosa (1762–1770) 
 Juan José Priego y Caro, O.P. (1772–1779) 
 Luis Velasco y Maeda, O.F.M. (1779–1792)
 Lorenzo Suarez de Cantillana (1797–1799)
 Nicolás Videla del Pino (1802–1806), appointed Bishop of Salta, Argentina
 Pedro García de Panés, O.F.M. (1807–1838)
 Basilio López (1844–1859)
 Juan Gregorio Urbieta (1860–1865)
 Manuel Antonio Palacios (1865–1868)
 Pietro Giovanni Aponte (1879–1891)
 Juan Sinforiano Bogarín (1894–1949)

Archdiocese of Asunción
Elevated: 1 May 1929
Latin Name: Sanctissimae Assumptionis

 Juan José Aníbal Mena Porta (1949–1970)
 Ismael Blas Rolón Silvero, S.D.B. (1970–1989)
 Felipe Santiago Benítez Ávalos (1989–2002)
 Pastor Cuquejo, C.S.S.R. (2002–2014)
 Edmundo Valenzuela, S.D.B. (2014– )

Coadjutor bishops
Martín de Sarricolea y Olea (1720), did not take effect
José Luis Palos Bord, O.F.M. (1721–1724)
Manuel Antonio Palacios (1863–1865)
Juan José Aníbal Mena Porta (1941–1949)
Edmundo Ponziano Valenzuela Mellid, S.D.B. (2011–2014)

Auxiliary bishops
Marco Antonio Maiz (1844–1848)
Juan Gregorio Urbieta (1856–1860), appointed Bishop here
Juan José Aníbal Mena Porta (1936–1941), appointed Coadjutor here
Ramón Pastor Bogarín Argaña (1954–1957), appointed Bishop of San Juan Bautista de las Misiones
Aníbal Maricevich Fleitas (1957–1965), appointed Bishop of Concepción y Chaco
Felipe Santiago Benitez Avalos (1961–1965), appointed	Bishop of Villarrica (later returned here as Archbishop)
Julio Benigno Laschi González (1965–1969)
Juan Moleón Andreu (1967–1972), appointed Bishop of Paraguay, Military
Jorge Adolfo Carlos Livieres Banks (1976–1987), appointed Prelate of Encarnación
Eustaquio Pastor Cuquejo Verga, C.SS.R. (1982–1992), appointed Bishop of Paraguay, Military (later returned here as Archbishop)
Claudio Giménez Medina, P. Schönstatt (1991–1995), appointed Bishop of Caacupé
Ricardo Jorge Valenzuela Rios (1993–2003), appointed Bishop of Paraguay, Military
Adalberto Martínez Flores (1997–2000), appointed Bishop of San Lorenzo

Other priests of this diocese who became bishops
Juan González Melgarejo, appointed Bishop of Santiago de Chile in 1743
Joaquín Hermes Robledo Romero (priest here, 1975–2000), appointed Coadjutor Bishop of Carapeguá in 2009

See also
 Roman Catholicism in Paraguay

References

External links
 Official site
 Catholic-Hierarchy
 GCatholic.org

Organisations based in Asunción
1547 establishments in the Spanish Empire
Religious organizations established in the 1540s
Roman Catholic dioceses in Paraguay
Roman Catholic dioceses established in the 16th century
Roman Catholic Ecclesiastical Province of Asunción
Roman Catholic ecclesiastical provinces in Paraguay